Chlapci a Chlapi is a TV series produced and broadcast in Czechoslovakia in 1988. It follows the story of a group of Czech and Slovak men in their mandatory army service. The series was generally well received and is very well known in Central Europe. It stars Martin Zounar, Boris Slivka, Roman Hajek, Josef Bláha, Jaroslava Adamová and others. The show was directed by Evžen Sokolovský.

References

External links

Czechoslovak television series
1988 Czechoslovak television series debuts
Czech drama television series
1980s Czechoslovak television series
Czech military television series
Works about the Czechoslovak Army
Czechoslovak Television original programming